Frank Portelli is a former member of the Maltese Parliament, serving during the 1987-1992 legislature.

He was born on 8 June, 1944 in Hamrun, Malta.

Frank Portelli was president of Executive Committee of the Nationalist Party between 1985 and 1992. Between 1995 and 1998, he held the position of President of the General Council for the same party. He was head of the Maltese delegation to the Council of Europe in 1987.

Portelli is the CEO of St Philip's Hospital in Malta.

European Parliament
In March 2009, then leader of the Nationalist Party Lawrence Gonzi asked Portelli to stand as a European parliamentary candidate for the MEP elections of June 6 . He failed to be elected.

References

1944 births
Living people
Members of the House of Representatives of Malta
Nationalist Party (Malta) politicians
20th-century Maltese politicians
People from Ħamrun